The Sapporo Tokyu Open was a professional golf tournament that was held in Japan from 1973 to 1998. It was an event on the Japan Golf Tour. It was held in June on the Shimamatsu course at Sapporo Kokusai Country Club in Kitahiroshima, Hokkaido from 1975. The Shimamatsu course previously hosted the All Japan Doubles, a team event, from 1969 to 1973.

Tournament hosts

Winners

References

External links
Coverage on Japan Golf Tour's official site
Sapporo Kokusai C.C. site winners list 

Former Japan Golf Tour events
Defunct golf tournaments in Japan
Sport in Hokkaido
Recurring sporting events established in 1973
Recurring sporting events disestablished in 1998